Ivan Karačić (born 26 May 1985, Mostar) is a Bosnian handball player for Maccabi Rishon LeZion and the Bosnian national team.

Ivan made his debut for the national team of Bosnia and Herzegovina on August 16, 2004, in a friendly match against the Croatia in Pula. His first official game was played on June 8, 2011 against Hungary. In 76 games played Karačić scored 159 goals, which makes him one of the most effective representatives of Bosnia and Herzegovina.

Club career
This brilliant centre back made his first handball steps in his hometown of Mostar, playing for HRMK Zrinjski, after which he transferred to RK Izviđač, in 2007. After a good season and 132 goals scored he was noticed by scouts of RK Borac, Banja Luka, one of the most successful clubs in former Yugoslavia who won the Champions Cup in 1976, in the next season played in the final of this prestigious competition, and won the EHF Cup in 1991. Playing for Borac he won the Bosnian National Cup in 2011 and played in EHF Cup. After four successful seasons in Borac he transferred to the Belarusian club Meshkov in 2012, with whom he has won two consecutive championships in seasons 2013/2014 and 2014/2015, as well as the national cup. In 2013 they were the winners of the regular SEHA league, and in the next two seasons were finalists of this European competition. In the current season he moved to the Romanian first division team HC Minaur Baia Mare who made a big surprise during season 2014/2015 winning the national championship and provided performance in the EHF Champions League. The start of the season was marked by injuries, but in the last six matches Ivan scored 64 goals in the championship and 24 goals in the last four matches of EHF Championship League. At the beginning of February 2016 he moved to Swiss champion Kaddeten Schaufhausen and won triple crown in his first season - National championship, Cup and SuperCup. In November, 2016 he moved to Israel Maccabi Rishon LeZion and won the National Championship in his first season. With 163 goals scored in 27 games he was recognized as an MVP of Israel league and the best foreign player.

Bosnian-Herzegovinian national team
With the national team of Bosnia and Herzegovina he fulfilled his childhood dream and competed at the World Championships in Qatar. He was one of the bravest players on the Bosnian team, and used to play games with both broken hands. "The team of Bosnia and Herzegovina has given me everything and now I will make it repay with every ounce of energy I have given this team. There is nothing in the world that can stop me to die for the team. All boys from Herzegovina yearn for the Croatian national team. Of course, it has objective reasons. Croatian national team is a world brand. All the players would like to play every competition for a medal. Now this is another image, lots of young boys would rather go to play for Bosnia and Herzegovina because it opens the opportunity, now when we qualified for the World Cup", said Karačić after reaching his team to the championship in Qatar.

Personal life
Karačić comes from a sports family. Igor, his brother who is three years younger, plays for the Macedonian champion team Vardar from Skopje. His youngest brother, Goran, is a goal keeper at the football club Adanaspor. All of them are playing for national teams - Ivan is the member of the senior national team of Bosnia and Herzegovina, while Goran plays for the U-19 national team of Bosnia and Herzegovina. The middle brother Igor successfully performs for the Croatian handball team.

It's an interesting story that attracted the attention of domestic and international media during the last World Cup in Qatar when the brothers Igor and Ivan played against each other in the group stage meeting between the Croatian and Bosnia and Herzegovina. Igor was more successful, scoring 7 goals in the 28:21 victory of the Croatian team.

The Karačić brothers have always had the support of their father Ante, who says that the family has always been firmly on the ground, but to a lot of effort, work and sacrifice his sons invested in their careers was given back through sports success.

Honours
Borac Banja Luka
Bosnian Handball Cup: 2010–11

Meshkov Brest
Belarusian First League: 2013–14, 2014–15
Belarusian Handball Cup: 2013–14, 2014–15

Maccabi Rishon LeZion
Israeli Handball Championship: 2016–17, 2019–20

References

External links

1985 births
Living people
Croats of Bosnia and Herzegovina
Bosnia and Herzegovina male handball players
Sportspeople from Mostar
Expatriate handball players
Bosnia and Herzegovina expatriate sportspeople in Belarus
Bosnia and Herzegovina expatriate sportspeople in Israel
Bosnia and Herzegovina expatriate sportspeople in Romania
Bosnia and Herzegovina expatriate sportspeople in Switzerland
RK Borac Banja Luka players